Tohoraata is a genus of eomysticetid baleen whale from the Late Oligocene (Chattian) of New Zealand. There are two recognized species, T. raekohao and T. waitakiensis.

Classification
Tohoraata is a member of the family Eomysticetidae, a family of primitive baleen-bearing mysticetes (chaeomysticetes). The type species, T. raekohao, is based on OU 22178, a partial skull associated with a thoracic vertebra and five ribs, collected from the Maerewhenua Member of the Otekaike Limestone. On the other hand, T. waitakiensis, is known from OMC GL 402, a partial skull and five neck vertebrae collected in the Kokoamu Greensand. It was originally described as a species of Mauicetus, but was eventually recognized as more primitive than the type species of Mauicetus, being closely related to Eomysticetus and Yamatocetus.

Description
Tohoraata is distinct from all eomysticetid taxa, including Tokarahia, in having a posterolaterally directed exoccipital. The two species of Tohoraata differ from each other in the structure of the tympanic bulla, and differ from Eomysticetus and Yamatocetus in possessing numerous foramina in the frontal.

References

Oligocene mammals of Oceania
Oligocene cetaceans
Extinct animals of New Zealand
Prehistoric cetacean genera